The 3rd Yerevan Golden Apricot International Film Festival was a film festival held in Yerevan, Armenia from 10–15 July 2006. The annual festival presented about 120 films from 43 countries. Participants included some of the most highly acclaimed figures of world cinema - such as Marco Bellocchio, Tonino Guerra, Mohsen Makhmalbaf, Godfrey Reggio and Artavazd Peleshyan, who were honored with Lifetime Achievement Awards. More than 110 foreign guests attended the festival, which included filmmakers, actors, producers and distributors. The festival was covered by a number of international media, including Euronews and Arte. The international juries, headed by Moritz de Hadeln (Feature Competition), Godfrey Reggio (Documentary Competition) and Arsinee Khanjian (Armenian Panorama), awarded the following prizes: Golden Apricot 2006 for the Best Feature Film to Hou Hsiao-hsien for his film Three Times, (Taiwan/China/France); Golden Apricot 2006 for the Best Documentary Film to Workingman's Death by Michael Glawogger, (Austria); and Golden Apricot 2006 for the Best Film in "Armenian Panorama" to The Dwellers of Forgotten Islands by Hrant Hakobyan, (Armenia).

About the Golden Apricot Yerevan International Film Festival 
The Golden Apricot Yerevan International Film Festival (GAIFF) is an annual film festival held in Yerevan, Armenia. The festival was founded in 2004 with the co-operation of the “Golden Apricot” Fund for Cinema Development, the Armenian Association of Film Critics and Cinema Journalists. The GAIFF is continually supported by the Ministry of Foreign Affairs of the RA, the Ministry of Culture of the RA and the Benevolent Fund for Cultural Development.The objectives of the festival are "to present new works by the film directors and producers in Armenia and foreign cinematographers of Armenian descent and to promote creativity and originality in the area of cinema and video art".

Awards GAIFF 2006

See also 
 Golden Apricot Yerevan International Film Festival
 Atom Egoyan
 Serge Avedikian
 Andreas Dresen
 Artavazd Peleshyan
 Mohsen Makhmalbaf
 Godfrey Reggio
 Cinema of Armenia
 2006 in film

References

Yerevan International Film Festival
21st century in Yerevan
2006 in Armenia
2006 film festivals
2006 festivals in Asia
2006 festivals in Europe